I Met a Murderer is a 1939 British thriller film directed by Roy Kellino and starring James Mason, Pamela Mason, Sylvia Coleridge and William Devlin. A man murders his oppressive wife and flees from the police. He meets a young woman who suspects his identity as the murderer, but conceals this because she wants to use the story for a book. The film was shot on the Isle of Wight in 1939.

Cast
 James Mason as Mark Warrow  
 Pamela Mason as Jo Trent 
 Sylvia Coleridge as Martha Warrow  
 William Devlin as Jay  
 Peter Coke as Horseman  
 Esma Cannon as Blond Camper  
 Sheila Morgan as Brunet Camper  
 James Harcourt as Hay Wagon Driver 
 Sheppy as The Dog

Critical reception
Allmovie called it a "nerve-wracking British suspenser"; while TV Guide gave the film two out of four stars, noting, "Several novel twists in the tale of a fugitive on the run make this one fascinating."

References

External links

 

1939 films
1930s crime thriller films
British crime thriller films
British black-and-white films
Films set in England
Films shot in England
Films directed by Roy Kellino
1930s English-language films
1930s British films